The Bösendorfer Model 290 Imperial, or Imperial Bösendorfer (also colloquially known as the 290) is the largest model and flagship piano manufactured by Bösendorfer, at around  long,  wide, and weighing . It has an eight-octave range from C0 to C8. For 90 years it was the only concert grand piano in the world with 97 keys, until it was joined in 1990 by the instruments of Stuart & Sons of Australia. Music critic Melinda Bargreen has described the Imperial as the ne plus ultra of pianos, while pianist Garrick Ohlsson dubbed it the "Rolls-Royce of pianos".

Extra keys 
Bösendorfer built the first Imperial in 1909, following a suggestion by composer Ferruccio Busoni to build a model with an extended range. Busoni sought to extend the range to accommodate his transcription of Johann Sebastian Bach's organ works. In order to emulate the 32 foot registers available on some large organs, he needed the entire octave down to C0.

The Bösendorfer Imperial features 97 keys: a full eight octaves. This is in contrast to their other extended model, the Bösendorfer 225, which has 92 keys (down to F0). The extra keys, which are all at the bass end of the keyboard (that is, to the left), are colored black so that the pianist can tell them apart from the normal keys of an 88-key piano. They were originally covered with a removable panel to prevent a pianist from accidentally playing the extra notes. While the keys are seldom used, the extra bass strings create additional harmonic resonance that contributes to an overall richer sound. Compositions have been written specifically to utilize the extra keys.
Pianist and University of Washington School of Music director Robin McCabe explains the challenge of adjusting to the extra keys: "One's 'southern sight-lines,' so to speak, can be seriously skewed because of the extra footage in the bass. Ending a piece such as Debussy's L'isle joyeuse, for example, with its nose-dive final gesture to the low A of the piano, becomes a bit more problematic when that A is not the lowest note on the piano!" Reportedly, "[the] 290 has proved a bit of a temperamental star, sounding harsh and jarring in the hands of pianists who do not understand how to play it and marvellously refined in the hands of those who do".

Pricing and availability
Bösendorfer Imperial Concert Grand pianos, handcrafted in Austria, retail for between US$256,000 and $560,000 in the U.S., depending on finish, design and whether the Disklavier Enspire computer reproducing system is installed. (Bösendorfer's CEUS reproducing system, "Create Emotions with Unique Sound", developed in-house, is more expensive still.) In 1977, the price was reported to be $35,000, $ in  adjusted for inflation.

While the concert piano market is dominated by Steinway & Sons, which signs prominent artists to a performance agreement and urges them to refrain from playing any other piano brand, performers preferring the Bösendorfer Imperial will often have that piano shipped with them while on tour.

Notable composers and performers

 Tori Amos
 Wilhelm Backhaus
 Paul Badura-Skoda
 Victor Borge
 Malcolm Frager
 Keith Jarrett
 Valentina Lisitsa
 Garrick Ohlsson
 Charlemagne Palestine
 Oscar Peterson
 Terry Riley
 Carol Rosenberger
 András Schiff
 Wibi Soerjadi
 Cecil Taylor
 La Monte Young
 Frank Zappa

References

External links 
 Bösendorfer piano company official site of the Bösendorfer piano company
 BosendorferImperial.com site dedicated to the Imperial pianos, with complete audio files of songs, images, history, specs
 Bösendorfer model 290 Imperial (in German)
Photos of a Bosendorfer Model 290 Imperial Grand Piano Extra Keys

Piano
Bösendorfer